The Green Light Trust is an environmental and educational charity whose mission is to bring communities and landscapes to life through 'hands-on' learning and the growing of woodlands.

Overview

The Green Light Trust has been working in environmental and social change for 20 years. They have a long-term relationship with remote rainforest dwellers in Papua New Guinea. The aim of their work both there and in the UK is to empower individuals, communities and businesses to make informed choices. 

The mission of the Trust is to bring communities and landscapes to life through 'hands-on' learning and the growing of woodlands. With independence and self-sufficiency as the goal, they work with both urban and rural communities to find land, design, plant, manage and own their woodland projects.

The Trust also provide education for sustainable development through local action and global citizenship. Their work in schools involves pupils from early years to the sixth form; from gathering seeds to caring for woods in order to help them develop as wise caretakers of the earth’s resources.

They are based in their headquarters in Lawshall at the Foundry, a carbon neutral building. The Trust have nearly 60 rural and urban community-owned woodland projects in 8 counties throughout the East of England Region with others in Yorkshire, Kent and London. Around 70 hectares of land are now under community management and they have over 1000 committed volunteers with over 3000 children engaged in continual school programmes.

The organisation began in 1993. Their overall goal now is to build a unique patchwork of rejuvenated landscapes and communities, to initiate 200 projects and impact on 100,000 children.

Main aims

 Enhancing children's environmental education
 Strengthening local communities
 Helping achieve results in business through resource management
 Conserving our natural heritage for the future.

Activities
 Training opportunities for children, businesses, and local communities.
 Conserving the natural heritage for the future through innovative Community-owned WildSpace programmes.
 Provision of an award-winning venue for hire.
 Assisting companies develop corporate social responsibility initiatives.
 Providing resource management training for business and helping them with sustainability.

Community and cohesion

The Trust believe that by building strong connections between local people, schools, businesses and nature, a lasting difference can be made to the environment and people's attitudes to nature. Planting and managing a community wild space brings local people together, and the recreational area they create generates a feeling of pride and ownership amongst the community.

The planting of Wild spaces by the community can generate lasting benefits including:

 a strong, close-knit community
 unique educational opportunities for local children
 an increase in wildlife and biodiversity in the area
 global awareness and international friendships.

Forest for Our Children 
Forest for Our Children was the Trust's first Community-owned WildSpace project. It has been the inspiration behind their many  other WildSpace sites around the UK and their environmental education programmes for schools. Based near the Trust's headquarters in Lawshall, Forest for Our Children is 9 hectares of land made up of 2 woods in the parish.  Crooked Wood was planted in 1993 and Golden Wood between 1994 and 2010.

Community-owned WildSpace Scheme
Green Light Trust's Community-owned WildSpace Scheme was started in 2001 with a unique funding partnership from B&Q, Forestry Commission and Suffolk County Council. Over the last 10 years the Scheme has been a tremendous success.  Working in partnership with local communities, Green Light has helped to establish nearly 60 rural and urban projects in 8 counties (including 2 business WildSpaces in Oxford and Cambridge.

Through the Trust's environmentally led approach, the Community-owned WildSpace Scheme has directly empowered at least 30,000 individuals in 58 communities to enhance, enjoy and value their local environment; and encouraged social responsibility by enabling individuals and organisations to get involved in social action on their doorsteps. Many uncommon and endangered species now colonise the woodlands and wild spaces that have been created.

Children and education
Children are at the heart of our work at the Green Light Trust who believe educating children about the environment, and helping teachers inspire a love of nature within them, is an essential step in tackling environmental issues. The Trust run a number of school programmes for children and courses for adults working in education, with 3 clear aims:
 Environmental education for all
 Engaging and interactive learning experiences
 Lifelong bonds between people and nature

The Trust promote forest schools, a highly successful Scandinavian education programme promoting woodland-based classrooms which give children the opportunity to learn outdoors and explore the environment.

The Foundry
The Foundry is the Green Light Trust's headquarters and training centre which is set in 2.5 acres of meadowland at Bury Road, Lawshall. In 2006, The Foundry was awarded a prestigious RIBA Sustainability Award. Built using "deep green" construction methods, it is a carbon neutral building that is as autonomous as possible.

The Foundry was originally an 1840s threshing barn that was transformed into a traction engine maintenance shed in the 1880s. It later became a forge and foundry between 1920 and 1950. Abandoned for 50 years, Green Light Trust decided to breathe new life into it and to make The Foundry their headquarters as well as a shining example of sustainable building in East Anglia. The project started on 27 May 2005 and a year later the self-sufficient and carbon-neutral building was completed. The building is available for hire.

See also
 Teach the Future

References

External links
 Green Light Trust website

Conservation in the United Kingdom
Conservation in England
Environmental education in the United Kingdom
Environmental organisations based in the United Kingdom
Organizations established in 1989
Charities based in Suffolk
Lawshall